Early Nigerian history relates to the period of history in Nigeria prior to the common era. Archaeological research has shown that people were already living in Isarun, Nigeria (specifically the Iwo-Eleru) as early as 11,000 BC and perhaps earlier at Ugwuelle-Uturu (Okigwe) in south-eastern Nigeria. Microlithic and ceramic industries were developed by savanna pastoralists from at least the 4th millennium BC and were continued by subsequent agricultural communities.

Iron Age
Kainji Dam excavations revealed ironworking by the 2nd century BC. The transition from Neolithic times to the Iron Age apparently was achieved without intermediate bronze production.  Others suggest the technology moved west from the Nile Valley, although the  Iron Age in the Niger River valley and the forest region appears to predate the introduction of metallurgy in the upper savanna by more than 800 years.

Nok Culture
The earliest identified Nigerian culture is the Nok culture that thrived between 1500 BC and 200 AD on the Jos Plateau in northeastern Nigeria. The Nok people were pioneers in ancient metallurgy, their derivation of advanced metal casting techniques such as the lost-wax (cire perdue) process for tools and weaponry are some of first-known applications of the craft. Sculptures found throughout Southwestern Nigeria indicate that the Nok Culture was a hub for art of a world renowned caliber.

References

History of Nigeria